I milanesi ammazzano al sabato (translation: Milanese Kill on Saturdays) is a 1969 crime novel by the Italian writer Giorgio Scerbanenco. It revolves the disappearance of the beautiful daughter of a truck driver, which leads the investigator to the slums and brothels of Milan. It was the final installment in Scerbanenco's Milan Quartet about the medical doctor and investigator Duca Lamberti.

Publication
The novel was published in 1969 through Garzanti in Milan. It has been translated into French, Spanish, Catalan and German.

Legacy
The novel was the basis for the 1970 Italian-German film La morte risale a ieri sera. The film was directed by Duccio Tessari and stars Frank Wolff as Lamberti.

It lent its title to the 2008 album I Milanesi Ammazzano il Sabato by the Italian rock band Afterhours.

References

External links
 Italian publicity page 

1969 novels
Italian crime novels
Italian mystery novels
Italian novels adapted into films
Italian-language literature
Novels by Giorgio Scerbanenco
Novels set in Milan
20th-century Italian novels